North Devon is a constituency represented in the House of Commons of the UK Parliament since 2019 by Selaine Saxby of the Conservative Party.

Boundaries

1832–1868: The Hundreds of Bampton, Black Torrington, Braunton, Crediton, Fremington, Halberton, Hartland, Hayridge, Hemyock, North Tawton and Winkleigh, Shebbear, Sherwill, South Molton, Tiverton, Witheridge, and West Budleigh.

1868–1885: The Hundreds of Bampton, Braunton, Crediton, Fremington, Halberton, Hartland, Hayridge, Hemyock, North Tawton, Shebbear, Sherwill, South Molton, Tiverton, Winkleigh, Witheridge, and West Budleigh.

1950–1974: The Boroughs of Barnstaple and South Molton, the Urban Districts of Ilfracombe and Lynton, and the Rural Districts of Barnstaple and South Molton.

1974–1983: The Boroughs of Barnstaple and Bideford, the Urban Districts of Ilfracombe, Lynton, and Northam, and the Rural Districts of Barnstaple, Bideford, and South Molton.

1983–2010: The District of North Devon, and the District of Mid Devon wards of Taw, Taw Vale, and West Creedy.

2010–present: The District of North Devon.

History

A two-seat constituency of the same name existed from 1832 to 1885, formally titled the 'Northern Division of Devon'.

This began at the 1832 general election, when the Reform Act 1832 divided the former two-seat Devon into Northern and Southern divisions, each of which elected two MPs using the bloc vote system of election. The constituency was abolished for the 1885 general election, when the Redistribution of Seats Act split the county into smaller single-seat divisions. Its second creation is current, and began at the 1950 general election (covering a smaller area than before). Prior to 1950, its territory was split between the old constituencies of Barnstaple and South Molton.

In the 20th century this area had a prominent national MP, Jeremy Thorpe, who led a Liberal Party revival countrywide, with particular strength in the south-west.  The Liberal Democrats and its predecessor the Liberal Party have, since the Second World War, performed strongly in this seat; it was held for twenty years by Thorpe as the Liberal leader. He lost it in the 1979 general election, amid a scandal as a married man in love with Norman Scott and Thorpe's alleged involvement in a plot to murder him, of which he was found not guilty the same year. At the 1992 general election Liberal Democrat Nick Harvey regained the seat from the Conservatives. He lost the seat 23 years later.

Members of Parliament

MPs 1832–1885

MPs since 1950
The Member of Parliament for the constituency is Selaine Saxby who succeeded the previous conservative MP Peter Heaton-Jones after the 2019 UK General Election.

Elections

Elections in the 2010s

Elections in the 2000s

Elections in the 1990s

Elections in the 1980s

Elections in the 1970s

Elections in the 1960s

Elections in the 1950s

Elections in the 1880s

 Caused by Northcote's appointment as First Lord of the Treasury and elevation to the peerage, becoming Earl of Iddesleigh.

Elections in the 1870s

 Caused by Northcote's appointment as Chancellor of the Exchequer.

Elections in the 1860s

 

 

 Caused by Northcote's appointment as Secretary of State for India

 Caused by Northcote's appointment as President of the Board of Trade

 Caused by Trefusis' elevation to the peerage, becoming Lord Clinton.

 Caused by Buller's death.

Elections in the 1850s

Elections in the 1840s

Elections in the 1830s

 Caused by Fortescue's succession to the peerage as 2nd Earl Fortescue

See also
 List of parliamentary constituencies in Devon

Notes

References

Sources

North Devon
Parliamentary constituencies in Devon
Constituencies of the Parliament of the United Kingdom established in 1832
Constituencies of the Parliament of the United Kingdom disestablished in 1885
Constituencies of the Parliament of the United Kingdom established in 1950